A magic lantern is an early type of image projector, an ancestor of the modern slide projector.

Magic lantern may also refer to:

Books
Magic Lantern, an alternate version of the comic book hero Green Lantern
 Magic Lantern (novel), 1945 novel by Lady Eleanor Smith
The Magic Lantern, a 1952 novel by Robert Carson satirizing Hollywood
The Magic Lantern, a 1988 autobiography by Swedish film director Ingmar Bergman
The Magic Lantern, a 1990 book by Timothy Garton Ash recounting the fall of communism throughout Eastern Europe
The Punch and Judy Murders, also published under the title The Magic Lantern Murders

Music
The Magic Lanterns, a 1960s music group 
Magic Lantern, an album by Haymarket Square

Theatre
Magic Lantern, a street theater and puppetry group in the 1970s, formed by Taffy Thomas
Laterna Magika, a Czech theater in Prague which served as the headquarters for the Velvet Revolution reform movement
Magic Lantern (theater), a theater in Bridgton, Maine, United States.
Rainbow and Magic Lantern Cinemas, in Canada

Software
Magic Lantern (firmware), enhancements to Canon digital SLRs
Magic Lantern (software), FBI keylogging and surveillance software

Other uses
Magic Lantern (charity), United Kingdom-based educational charity
 Magic Lamp (film), a 2008 Indian Malayalam film

See also
Laterna magica (disambiguation)
Aladdin
Jinn